Golden Harvest is the self-titled debut and only studio album by pop group Golden Harvest. It was released in 1978 by Zodiac Records, and it peaked at 38 in New Zealand. It contains their best known single "I Need Your Love".

Track listing

Personnel
 Karl Gordon – vocals
 Kevin Kaukau – lead guitar
 Gavin Kaukau – rhythm guitar
 Eru Kaukau – bass
 Mervyn Kaukau – drums

Special thanks:
 Mike Harvey – keyboard
 Peter Woods – string arrangements
 ? – Yamaha C580

References

http://www.audioculture.co.nz/people/golden-harvest
https://web.archive.org/web/20131119011229/http://www.amplifier.co.nz/artist/89202/golden-harvest.html
https://www.discogs.com/Golden-Harvest-Golden-Harvest/release/5358169

1978 debut albums